Uta Francke is a German-American physician-geneticist known for her accomplishments in mapping genes to specific chromosome locations and discovering the genes and underlying mutations responsible for Prader-Willi and Rett syndromes. Her work on detailed mapping of human chromosome laid the foundation of the Human Genome Project and discovery of many other rare genetic disorders. She is currently a professor of Genetics and Pediatrics Emerita at Stanford University. She has also served as a consultant to 23andMe Inc since 2007, and as a part-time employee from 2010-2013.

Francke is a past-president of the American Society of Human Genetics (ASHG) and a founding member of the American College of Medical Genetics.

Early life 

Francke was born in 1942 in a small town just north of Frankfurt, Germany. Her father, who had a law degree, fought for Germany in World War II, and her mother was an elementary school teacher. Francke's father died from what was assumed as a heart attack at age 46, when she was 12 years old. Francke became interested in medicine after high school and eventually graduated from University of Munich in 1967 with a M.D. In 1978, Uta Francke got a license to fly a small plane and joined a flying club in New Haven.

Research 

Dr. Uta Francke's research spans across five decades ranging from human and mouse chromosome identification and gene mapping to the discovery of genes involved in heritable disorders and their functions. Her laboratory developed mouse models for human micro-deletion syndromes as well as the original nomenclature for band patterns of mouse chromosomes. Francke has been a HHMI investigator from 1989 to 2000.

She has over 500 peer-reviewed publications with groundbreaking insights into Charcot–Marie–Tooth disease, Marfan syndrome, Prader–Willi syndrome, and Williams syndrome. In 1994, her laboratory discovered the gene for the inherited immunodeficiency Wiskott–Aldrich syndrome. In 1999, she co-discovered the gene for Rett syndrome, an autism-like disorder that is one of the most common causes of developmental mental disability among girls.

Awards 

 Original Member, Highly Cited Researchers database, ISI (2002)
 Antoine Marfan Award, National Marfan Foundation (1996)
 President, International Federation of Human Genetics Societies (2000-2002)
 Elected President, American Society of Human Genetics (1999)
 Elected Member, American Academy of Arts and Sciences (1997)
 Elected Fellow, American Association for the Advancement of Science (1995)
 Elected Member, Institute of Medicine (National Academies) (1990)
 Elected Associate Member, European Molecular Biology Organization (2009)
 Colonel Harland Sanders Lifetime Achievement Award in Genetics, March of Dimes Birth Defects Foundation (2001)
 William Allan Award, American Society for Human Genetics (2012)
 Award for Excellence in Molecular Diagnostics, Association for Molecular Pathology (2014)

References 

1942 births
Living people
American geneticists
Stanford University faculty
Howard Hughes Medical Investigators
American women scientists
21st-century American women
Members of the National Academy of Medicine